Orvil Elliott (15 September 1885 – 1 February 1954) was a Canadian gymnast. He competed in the men's artistic individual all-around event at the 1908 Summer Olympics.

References

1885 births
1954 deaths
Canadian male artistic gymnasts
Olympic gymnasts of Canada
Gymnasts at the 1908 Summer Olympics
Gymnasts from Toronto